Rafet Rama (born 5 December 1971) is a Kosovan politician and lawmaker who ran for the 2016 presidential election, in which he was defeated by Hashim Thaçi.  He is a member of the Democratic Party of Kosovo.

References

1971 births
Living people
Democratic Party of Kosovo politicians
Place of birth missing (living people)